Martin Kelly may refer to:

Martin Kelly (footballer), English footballer
Martin Kelly (musician), British musician and record label boss
Martin Kelly (rugby union), Irish rugby union player
Martin Kelly (judoka), Australian judoka